The Men's short metric round team 1A-6 was an archery competition in the 1984 Summer Paralympics.

The French team won the gold medal.

Results

References

1984 Summer Paralympics events